The Natural Dog Food Company is a producer of 100% natural holistic complete dog foods.

The Natural Dog Food Company sometimes referred to as "Natural Dog Food" or simply "Natural Dog", is a family-owned company based in the village of Heckington in the English county of Lincolnshire. The company was established in 2007 with the aim of producing an alternative to natural, home-prepared diets including the BARF diet.

Products 
Since the original all-in-one complete dry food was created in 2007, The Natural Dog Food Company has continued to develop its range of dry foods to include three types for adult dogs, two puppy foods, and a senior/light diet. In 2010, several new complete food varieties were trialed including a large bite variety and an active formula. The company also produces its own range of 'Hearties' dog treats.  The company has recently expanded its product line to include natural cat foods.  They offer canned wet food for cats along with dry cat food which both feature 100% human-grade meats.

Ingredients 
The Natural Dog Food Company puts its emphasis on 100% natural ingredients. The company's primary USP is the inclusion of only natural vitamins through the use of a herbal premix. Natural vitamins are widely believed to be nutritionally superior to their synthetic counterparts which are extensively used in conventional pet foods.
 
Other ingredients include British chicken, lamb, turkey and salmon, whole brown rice, whole barley, whole oats, various vegetables, whole linseed, sugar beet, brewer's yeast and seaweed. The company does not use animal by-products or ingredients like corn, wheat, soy or dairy products which have been linked to food allergies and intolerances in dogs.

Grain Free range was added in 2019.

Name Changes 
In 2011, the brand name "All in One" was scheduled to be dropped in favor of the "Natural Dog Food Company" brand. At the same time "Hearties" treats will be renamed "Natural Dog Food Company Treats".

References 

Dog food brands